Maków-Kolonia  is a village in the administrative district of Gmina Maków, within Skierniewice County, Łódź Voivodeship, in central Poland.

Curiosities
In 2009 a resident of the village had 12.3 per mille of alcohol in blood.

References

Villages in Skierniewice County